The Gwalior Gharana (Gwalior school of classical music) is one of the oldest Khyal Gharana in Indian classical music. The rise of the Gwalior Gharana started with the reign of the Mughal emperor Akbar (1542–1605).

The favourite singers of this patron of the arts, such as Miyan Tansen, who was the most famous vocalist at the court, came from the town of Gwalior.

History
The Gwalior Gharana evolved during the time of the Mughal Empire (1526CE  1857 CE). Among the early masters (ustad) were Naththan Khan, Naththan Pir Bakhsh and his grandsons Haddu, Hassu and Natthu Khan. The head musician in the imperial court was Bade Mohammad Khan, who was famous for his taan bazi style. Both Bade Mohammad Khan and Naththan Pir Bakhsh belonged to the same tradition of Shahi Sadarang (also known as Nemat Khan, dhrupad singer and veena player in the court of Mohammad Shah (1702 CE  1748 CE).

Hassu Khan (died 1859 CE) and Haddu Khan (died 1875 CE) continued to develop the Gwalior style of singing. Haddu Khan's son Ustad Bade Inayat Hussain Khan (1852  1922) was also a singer but his style departed from the methodical Gwalior style.

Among the brothers' students were Vasudeva Buwa Joshi (died 1890), who became a teacher; and Ramkrishna Deva, who became a musician in Dhar. It was Ramkrishna Deva's student, Balakrishnabuwa Ichalkaranjikar (1849  1926) who brought the Gwaliori gaeki (singing style) to Maharashtra state.

Another prominent disciple of the duo was a Muslim dhrupad and dhamar singer from Amritsar, Miyan Banney Khan (1835  1910). He introduced Khyal in Punjab and Sindh and then took a musical position at the court of Nizam of Hyderabad. Miyan Banney Khan's pupils included his cousin, Amir Khan (also known as "Meeran Bukhsh Khan"), Gamman Khan, Bhai Atta, Ali Bukhsh ,Kale Khan, Mian Qadir (sarangi), Bhai Wadhawa and Bhai Wasawa.

These all disciples started their own Gharanas and their descendants are still the most respected musicians of the subcontinent. Amir Khan also shared Miyan Banney khan's cheejs with the pupils of Pt. Balkrishnabuwa Ichalkaranjikar when he stayed in Miraj for sometime. However, his disciples included among others his four sons. One of the sons, Pyare Khan, became a professional musician. Another son, Baba Sindhe Khan (1885  18 June 1950) became a music teacher and trained pupils such as the educator B. R. Deodhar (1901  1990); the singer Bade Ghulam Ali Khan (1902  1968), and Farida Khanam (born 1935).

On 19 August 1922, Pyare Khan performed at the second annual celebration of the independence of Afghanistan. He became a mentor to a singer from Afghanistan, also performing at the celebration. This was the singer, Qasim Afghan ("Qasimju") (born 1878, Kabul). Pyare Khan also remained a musician at the court of Maharajadhiraj Maharawal (Sir Jawahir Singh) of Jaisalmer (1914  1949). He was also a teacher of Seth Vishandas of Hyderabad in Sindh near Karachi and Mahant Girdharidas of Bhuman Shah, Punjab.

Pyare Khan's sons were Umeed Ali Khan (1910  1979) and Ghulam Rasool Khan. They became respected classical vocalists of their times. Ghulam Rasool Khan had two sons, Hameed Ali Khan and Fateh Ali Khan.

Krishnarao Shankar Pandit (1893  1989) was a musician of the Gwalior gharana heritage. His father, Shankarrao Pandit was a student of Haddu Khan, Nathu Khan and Nissar Hussain Khan, Nathu Khan's son. Krishnarao Shankar Pandit practiced Khayal, Tappa and Tarana singing as well as layakari.

In 1914, Krishnarao Shankar Pandit opened a school in Gwalior, the Shankar Gandharva Mahavidyalaya. In 1921, he was awarded the title Gayak Shiromani at the All India Congress. Pandit became the court musician to Madhavrao Scindia of Gwalior; the State Musician of Maharashtra, an emeritus professor at Madhav Music College, Gwalior and an emeritus producer at All India Radio and Doordarshan. For his contribution to the world of classical music, he received awards including the Padma Bhushan in 1973 and the Tansen Award in 1980.

The students of Krishnarao Shankar Pandit included his son, Laxman Krishnarao Pandit, Sharadchandra Arolkar, Balasaheb Poochwale, and his granddaughter Meeta Pandit.

Pedagogical genealogy
The following map is based on accounts that Makkan Khan and Shakkar Khan were not related. These accounts are supported by research indicating that Makkan Khan's descendants were dhrupadiyas and Shakkar Khan's descendants were khayaliyas, thus reflecting different genealogies.

Recent pedagogy

Singing style
A distinguishing feature of the gharana is its simplicity: well known ragas (melodic modes) rather than obscure ones are selected and sapaat (straight) taans (fast melodic sequences) is emphasized. While there is some limited raga vistar (melodic expansion) and alankar (melodic ornamentation) to enhance the beauty and meaning of the raga, there is no slow-tempo alap as in Kirana and there is no attempt to include tirobhava or melodic phrases to obscure the identity of the raga or add complexity. When the gharana is performed, the bandish (composition) is key as it provides the melody of the raga and indications on its performance. While doing bol-baant (rhythmic play using the words of the bandish) the Gwalior style uses all the words of sthayi or antara in proper sequence, without disturbing their meaning.

The behlava is a medium tempo rendition of the notes which follows the pattern of the aroha (ascent) and the avaroha (descent) of the raga. The behlava is divided into the asthayi (notes from "Ma" to "Sa") and the antara (noted from "Ma", "Pa", or "Dha" to "Pa" of the higher register). The asthayi section is sung twice before the antara. Then follows a swar-vistar in a medium tempo using heavy meends (glides) and taans. The dugun-ka-alap follows in which groups of two or four note combinations are sung in quicker succession while the basic tempo remains the same. The bol-alap is the next part where the words of the text are sung in different ways. Then there is in faster tempo the murki where notes are sung with ornamentation. The bol-taans have melodic sequences set to the words of the bandish. The other taans, including the gamak, follow.

The sapat taan is important to the Gwalior style. It is the singing of notes in a straight sequence and at a vilambit pace. Both Dhrupad and Khyal singing evolved in Gwalior and there are many overlaps. In the khyal style there is one form, Mundi Dhrupad, that incorporates all the features of dhrupad singing but without the Mukhda.

Common ragas include Alhaiya Bilawal, Yaman, Bhairav, Sarang, Shree, Hameer, Gaud Malhar, and Miya Ki Malhar.

Exponents

19th Century and Earlier
 Babasaheb Dixit, disciple of Hassu Khan.
 Vishnupant Chattre (840  1905), disciple of Haddu Khan.
 Ghagge Nazir Khan (c. 1850  c. 1920), Qawwal Bacchon who learned from Chote Mohammed Khan and co-founded the Mewati Gharana.
 Faiz Mohammed Khan (d. 1920), disciple of Kadar Khan.
 Bade Inayat Hussain Khan (1840  1923), son of Ustad Haddu Khan Saheb 
 Balakrishnabuwa Ichalkaranjikar (1849  1926), disciple of Vasudevbuwa Joshi, Devjibuwa, and Chote Mohammed Khan.
 Bhaiyya Ganpatrao (1852  1920), disciple of Bande Ali Khan and Inayat Hussain Khan.
 Vishnu Digambar Paluskar (1872  1931), disciple of Balkrishnabuwa Ichalkaranjikar.

20th Century
 Ramkrishnabuwa Vaze (1871  1945), disciple of Bade Nissar Hussain Khan.
 Anant Manohar Joshi (1881  1967), disciple of Balakrishnabuwa Ichalkaranjikar, received Sangeet Natak Akademi Award (1955).
 Raja Bhaiya Poonchwale (1882  1956), disciple of Balakrishnabuwa Ichalkaranjikar
 Yashwant Sadashiv Mirashibuwa (1883  1966), disciple of Balakrishnabuwa Ichalkaranjikar.
 Krishnarao Shankar Pandit (1894  1989)
 Omkarnath Thakur (1897  1967), disciple of Vishnu Digambar Paluskar.
 Lal Mohammad Khan (d. 1962), son and disciple of Ata Muhammad Khan.
 Vinayakrao Patwardhan (1898  1975), disciple of Vishnu Digambar Paluskar and Ramkrishnabuwa Vaze, awarded Padma Bhushan (1972).
 B. R. Deodhar (1901  1990), disciple of Balakrishnabuwa Ichalkaranjikar, Vishnu Digambar Paluskar, Abdul Karim Khan, and Vinayakrao Patwardhan, received Sangeet Natak Akademi Award (1964) and Padma Shri (1976).
 Shankarrao Sapre, disciple of Vishnu Digambar Paluskar who founded Shriram Sangeet Vidyalaya at Nagpur in 1926.
 Deenanath Mangeshkar, disciple of Ramkrishnabuwa Vaze.
 Qurban Hussain Khan (1901  1970), son and disciple of Bade Inayat Hussain Khan.
 Narayanrao Vyas (1902  1984), disciple of Vishnu Digambar Paluskar, received Sangeet Natak Akademi Award (1976).
 Balwantrai Bhatt (1921  2016), disciple of Omkarnath Thakur.
 Dattatreya Vishnu Paluskar (1921  1955), son of Vishnu Digambar Paluskar who learned from Mirashibuwa, Narayanrao Vyas, and Vinayakrao Patwardhan.
 Manzoor Ali Khan (1922  1980), son and disciple of Jamalo Khan who also learned from Seendo Khan.
 Kumar Gandharva (1924  1992), disciple of B. R. Deodhar.
 Gajananbuwa Joshi (1911  1987), son and disciple of Anant Manohar Joshi. Also learned from Vilayat Hussain Khan of Agra gharana and Bhurji Khan of Jaipur-Atrauli gharana.
 Vinayakbuva Utturkar (Joshi) (1914 - 1989), son of Pt. Vishnu Keshav Utturkar (Joshi), Disciple of Yashwantbuwa Mirashi (Mirashi Buwa).

Contemporary artists
 Ghulam Hassan Shaggan (1928  2015), disciple of Bhai Lal Muhammad, awarded Sitara-e-Imtiaz (2000).
 Vasundhara Komkali (1931  2015), wife and disciple of Kumar Gandharva. Awarded Sangeet Natak Akademi Award and the Padma Shri.
 Narayanrao Bodas (1933  2017), son and disciple of Laxmanrao Bodas. Also learned from Pralhad Ganu.
 Sunanda Patnaik (1934  2020), disciple of Vinayakrao Patwardhan.
 Shankar Abhyankar (b. 1934), disciple of Narayanrao Vyas.
 Ashok Ranade (1937  2011), disciple of B. R. Deodhar, Gajananrao Joshi, and Laxman Bodas. Also learned from Pralhad Ganu of Agra gharana.
 Malini Rajurkar (b. 1941), disciple of  Govindrao Rajurkar, awarded Sangeet Natak Akademi award.
 Neela Bhagwat (b. 1942), disciple of Sharadchandra Arolkar and Jal Balporia.
 Iqbal Hussain Khan (1942  2010), son and disciple of Qurban Hussain Khan.
 Arun Kashalkar (b. 1943), disciple of Gajananrao Joshi. Also learned from Ram Marathe, D. V. Panke, Rajabhau Kogje, and Babanrao Haldankar.
 Vidyadhar Vyas (b. 1944), son and disciple of Narayanrao Vyas.
 Veena Sahasrabuddhe (1948  2016), daughter and disciple of Shankar Bodas, also learned from older brother, Kashinath.
 Vinayak Torvi (b. 1948), disciple of Gururao Deshpande, also learned from Bhimsen Joshi of Kirana gharana.
 Vijay Sardeshmukh (1952  2019), disciple of Kumar Gandharva.
 Vikas Kashalkar (b. 1955), disciple of Gajananrao Joshi.
 Ulhas Kashalkar (b. 1955), disciple of Gajananrao Joshi. Also learned from Ram Marathe of Agra gharana.
 Kedar Bodas (b. c. 1970s), son and disciple of Narayanrao Bodas. Also learned from Ashok Ranade.
 Meeta Pandit (b. 1967), daughter and disciple of Laxman Krishnarao Pandit. Also learned from grandfather, Krishnarao Shankar Pandit.
 Shashwati Mandal (b. 1971), disciple of Balasaheb Poonchwale.
 Manjusha Kulkarni-Patil (b. 1971), disciple of D. V. Kanebuwa.
 Pallavi Joshi (b. c. 1970s), disciple of Gajananrao Joshi, Madhukar Joshi, Sucheta Bidkar, Manohar Joshi, and Arun Kashalkar.
 Ateeq Hussain Khan (b. 1980), son and disciple of Iqbal Hussain Khan.

References

 
Gwalior culture
Indian classical music
Music schools in India